Flight of the Conchords is a New Zealand musical comedy duo formed in Wellington in 1998. The band consists of multi-instrumentalists Bret McKenzie and Jemaine Clement. Beginning as a popular live comedy act in the early 2000s, the duo's comedy and music became the basis of the self-titled BBC radio series (2005) and, subsequently, the HBO American television series (2007–2009). Most recently, they released the HBO comedy special Live in London in 2018. The special was concurrently released by Sub Pop as their fifth album. 

The duo's live performances have gained them a worldwide cult following, and they continue to tour periodically. They were named Best Alternative Comedy Act at the 2005 US Comedy Arts Festival and Best Newcomer at the Melbourne Comedy Festival, and received a nomination for the Perrier Comedy Award at the 2003 Edinburgh Festival Fringe. They have been twice-nominated for a Grammy Award—winning Best Comedy Album in 2008—and have received seven nominations for Emmy Awards.

Previously, they referred to themselves as "New Zealand's fourth most popular guitar-based digi-bongo acapella-rap-funk-comedy folk duo"; as of 2014, however, they refer to themselves as "the almost award-winning fourth-most-popular folk duo in New Zealand".

Career history

1998–2006: Early years
McKenzie and Clement were flatmates at Victoria University of Wellington, where they studied film and theatre before forming Flight of the Conchords in 1998. They first performed as part of a five-man group called So You're a Man, which included Taika Waititi and debuted at Wellington's BATS Theatre, garnering a small but loyal following in New Zealand and Australia.

The band first performed on television on Newtown Salad, a show on Wellington's short-lived local TV station "Channel 7" (later renamed "WTV"). They played two songs on the premiere episode in 1999 and then later appeared over four nights in 2000 (3–6 May); the songs, in order, were "Bowie", "Ladies of the World", "Petrov, Yelyena and Me", and "Hotties".

They performed at the Edinburgh Festival Fringe in 2002, 2003—when they were nominated for the Perrier Award—and 2004. They also performed at the Melbourne International Comedy Festival where they won the Best Newcomer Award. They were later featured in a 2004 campaign for British mobile phone retailer Phones 4U and in the show Stand Up! on Australia's ABC TV.

In 2005, HBO gave the group a special on their Friday night half-hour comedy series One Night Stand. They then headlined at the opening weekend at Comix comedy club, where they recorded two tracks included on 2007's The Distant Future. 

During this period, they had television development deals with Channel 4 in the UK, NBC in the United States, and TVNZ in New Zealand but, ultimately, shows were not produced. In 2006, they performed at the South by Southwest Music Festival in Austin, Texas. While in Texas, they recorded a documentary titled Flight of the Conchords: A Texan Odyssey, which aired on New Zealand's TV3 in late 2006.

BBC radio series

In 2004, the band created a six-part radio series for BBC Radio 2. Largely improvised, the series was broadcast in September 2005 and based on the band's search for commercial success in London. It featured Rob Brydon as their narrator, Rhys Darby as their manager and Jimmy Carr as a devoted fan called Kipper. The radio series is clearly a progenitor of the television series: the plot is similar—the band arriving in a foreign country to make their fortune, Rhys Darby playing their manager and calling band meetings—and many of the songs were later used in the television series.

The BBC Radio 2 series won the duo the Bronze Sony Radio Academy Award for comedy.

2007–2010: HBO television sitcom and further acclaim

TV sitcom

The duo starred in a television sitcom for HBO, titled Flight of the Conchords, which premiered in the United States in June 2007. The series simultaneously premiered in Canada on The Movie Network and Movie Central, and was also shown on The Comedy Network.

The series revolves around a fictional version of the pair as they try to achieve success as a band in New York City and try to develop an American fan base.  The regular cast includes fellow comedians Rhys Darby as Murray, Arj Barker as Dave, and Kristen Schaal as their obsessed fan Mel. This show also features many other comedians in guest starring roles. Their songs are woven into the plot of each episode. The show received an Emmy nomination for Best Comedy. The show was shot primarily in the Two Bridges neighbourhood of Manhattan.

The first season consisted of 12 episodes. The second season started on HBO on 18 January 2009 and consisted of 10 episodes. On 10 December 2009, the duo and co-creator/director James Bobin announced via their website that the show would not return for a third season.

Albums
The band's first studio release was the 2007 EP The Distant Future which included three studio recordings and three live tracks; on 10 February 2008, they were awarded the Grammy Award for Best Comedy Album for the record. In 2008, they signed with the label Sub Pop and released their self-titled debut full-length album. Following the second season of the show in 2009, the band released their second album, I Told You I Was Freaky.

Appearances

In June 2007, the band performed on the Late Show with David Letterman and were interviewed by Terry Gross on the NPR radio show Fresh Air. They appeared at the 2007 Bonnaroo Music Festival in Manchester, Tennessee. On 19 June 2007, they appeared as the musical guests on Late Night with Conan O'Brien. 

Their EP The Distant Future, produced by Mickey Petralia and recorded in Los Angeles and New York by Petralia and engineer Matt Shane, was released on 7 August 2007; the live portions were taken from concerts at Comix comedy club in New York City. In January 2008, the band spoke and performed as part of Comcast's presentation at CES 2008. 

On 13 February 2008, Flight of the Conchords had their first post-Grammy concert, a freebie show, at a small Wellington video store called Aro Video. On 5 March 2008, they performed at a private show at 'The Depot' in Salt Lake City, Utah, for the 2008 Omniture web analytics conference, and the following day in Cahn Auditorium at Northwestern University. On 24 April 2008, they gave a free show at Amoeba Music in Hollywood, California. On 28 May 2008, they performed at the Google I/O conference in San Francisco. They performed on the Main Stage of the Sasquatch! Music Festival on Monday, 26 May 2008 at The Gorge Amphitheatre in central Washington State. On 12 July 2008, they performed at Sub Pop's 20th Anniversary Music Festival. 

The duo made a special guest appearance as the aliens in two episodes of The Drinky Crow Show on Cartoon Network's late-night television programming block Adult Swim. On 31 March 2009, the duo performed in Masterton, New Zealand, to 2000 locals as a benefit for Jemaine's old college Makoura College raising around NZ$80,000 prior to setting off on a 50 date tour of the US. They also appeared on the season four finale of the Tim and Eric Awesome Show, Great Job!, briefly replacing Tim and Eric during a high-stakes game of tennis. The duo guest-starred as a pair of camp counselors in "Elementary School Musical", the season premiere of the 22nd season of The Simpsons, which aired 26 September 2010.

2011–present: Reunion, tours, and film
In an interview with Vulture, Bret said that plans were in the works for a reunion tour in 2012 and that he and Jemaine were discussing a Flight of the Conchords movie. On 28 November 2011, he stated that efforts were being made to bring the comedy folk duo to the big screen: "We're going to try and do a movie. We just need a story". However, HBO has stated they themselves do not have plans for such a film. In an interview published in Indiewire in August 2015, Clement said that a Flight of the Conchords movie was being written, although he indicated that it is still in the early phases.

It was confirmed in March 2012, that a full 10-show tour of larger New Zealand venues was in place for June 2012. Tickets went on sale on 23 March, with the premium seats at each venue available only in person at the box office, to prevent scalping. All original shows sold out within 10 minutes once they were released on general sale.

For Red Nose Day 2012, the duo recorded a charity single composed of lyrics volunteered by Auckland and Wellington school children, titled "Feel Inside (And Stuff Like That)". The song features performances from other New Zealand celebrities, including Dave Dobbyn, Brooke Fraser, Boh Runga, Samuel Flynn Scott, Luke Buda, Savage, Young Sid, Tyree, Deach, PNC, Zowie, Ruby Frost, Kids of 88, Rikki Morris, Moana Maniapoto, Nathan King, Maitereya, Victoria Girling-Butcher, Elizabeth Marvelly, Peter Urlich and Cherie Mathieson. The song entered at number one on the New Zealand Singles Chart, becoming their first number one and was certified Platinum, selling over 15,000 copies in its first week.

On 23 August 2013, Flight of the Conchords co-headlined the Oddball & Curiosity Festival with Dave Chappelle, kicking off the tour in Austin, Texas. In 2016, the duo performed new songs alongside old favourites on a North American tour; they also appeared at the 2016 Newport Folk Festival in Newport, Rhode Island. 

In 2018, Flight of the Conchords reunited for Flight of the Conchords: Live in London, a one-hour TV special on HBO.

Related projects
Both McKenzie and Clement appeared alongside Rhys Darby in a horror comedy titled Diagnosis: Death, though not as Flight of the Conchords. The film was released on 3 August 2009.

The song "I'm Not Crying" appears in the film The Pirates! In an Adventure with Scientists!. In 2014, both Clement and Rhys Darby starred in the horror comedy mockumentary titled What We Do in the Shadows, directed by Clement and Taika Waititi.

Style

Instrumentation
Traditionally, the duo both play acoustic guitar in live performances, with McKenzie almost always playing a standard grand concert-style acoustic guitar and Clement playing a parlor guitar and sometimes a classical guitar. For some songs, Clement plays acoustic bass guitar.

They commonly employ 1980s-era novelty instruments like the Casio DG-20 guitar synthesizer and Omnichord, in addition to glockenspiel, bongos, and autoharp, among others. In the past decade, they have expanded their instrumentation; more recent performances, like those during their 2018 tour of United Kingdom and Ireland, saw both playing electric bass guitar (with Clement playing a Höfner 500/1) and using effect pedals. Since 2008, they have collaborated with musician Nigel Collins, who plays cello, keyboards, and percussion, for both studio and live performances.

Discography

Albums
The Distant Future  (2007)
Flight of the Conchords (2008)
I Told You I Was Freaky (2009)
Live in London (2019)

Radio
 The BBC Radio Series: Flight of the Conchords (2006); broadcast 2005, 6 episodes

Filmography
 One Night Stand: Flight of the Conchords (2005); HBO half-hour comedy special
 Flight of the Conchords: A Texan Odyssey (2006); TV3 documentary
 Flight of the Conchords (2007–2009); HBO TV series, 22 episodes
 Flight of the Conchords: On Air (2009); NZ On Air documentary
Flight of the Conchords: Live in London (2018); HBO comedy special

Tours
Tours, excluding one-off performances and mini tours, from 2008 on:

 North America (March–July 2008)
 North America (March–May 2009)
 Europe (March–May 2010)
 New Zealand & Australia (June–July 2012)
 United States (August–September 2013)
 North America (June–July 2016)
 United Kingdom & Ireland (March, June–July 2018)

Awards
Selected accolades

References

External links

Early footage of Flight of the Conchords at the Edinburgh Festival Fringe in clip 1 and clip 2 on NZ On Screen. (Requires Adobe Flash)
 Flight of the Conchords on Weave 

 
Comedy radio characters
Comedy rock musical groups
Comedy television characters
Comedy theatre characters
Grammy Award winners
Musical groups established in 1998
New Zealand alternative rock groups
New Zealand comedy duos
New Zealand comedy musical groups
Sub Pop artists
Theatre characters introduced in 1998
Television characters introduced in 2000

he:טיסת הקונקורד (סדרה)